Comadia suaedivora is a moth in the family Cossidae. It is found in North America, where it has been recorded from California.

The wingspan is 12–16 mm for males and 12–17 mm for females. The forewings are fuscous. Adults have been recorded on wing from April to June.

The larvae feed gregariously on the crown and roots of Suaeda fruticosa. They have a rose-lavender body. Pupation takes place in a subterranean chamber in a dark brown pupa.

References

Natural History Museum Lepidoptera generic names catalog

Cossinae
Moths described in 1973
Moths of North America